Sarai Lakhmi is a village in Dalmau block of Rae Bareli district, Uttar Pradesh, India. It is located 4 km from Dalmau, the block headquarters. As of 2011, it has a population of 871 people, in 166 households. It has one pre-primary school and no healthcare facilities.

The 1961 census recorded Sarai Lakhmi (as "Sarai Lakhami") as comprising 2 hamlets, with a total population of 379 people (195 male and 184 female), in 78 households and 73 physical houses. The area of the village was given as 237 acres.

The 1981 census recorded Sarai Lakhmi (as "Sarai Lakhami") as having a population of 530 people, in 102 households, and having an area of 88.63 hectares. The main staple foods were listed as wheat and rice.

References

Villages in Raebareli district
Caravanserais in India